Aberdeen F.C. competed in the Scottish Premier Division, Scottish League Cup and Scottish Cup in season 1995–96.

Results

Scottish Premier Division

Final standings

Scottish League Cup

Scottish Cup

References

afcheritage.org 

Aberdeen F.C. seasons
Aberdeen